A Wonderful World is an album by Tony Bennett and k.d. lang released in 2002.

It later won the Grammy Award for Best Traditional Pop Vocal Album. In the U.S., the album achieved gold record status, and reached top 40 in the UK.

Track listing
 "Exactly Like You" (Dorothy Fields, Jimmy McHugh)  – 3:17
 "La Vie en Rose" (Mack David, David Louiguy, Edith Piaf)  – 3:23
 "I'm Confessin' (That I Love You)" (Doc Dougherty, Al J. Neiburg, Ellis Reynolds)  – 4:46
 "You Can Depend on Me" (Charles Carpenter, Carl M. Dunlap, Earl Hines)  – 3:00
 "What a Wonderful World" (Robert Thiele, George David Weiss)  – 3:23
 "That's My Home" (Otis Rene, Leon Rene)  – 3:05
 "A Kiss to Build a Dream On" (Oscar Hammerstein II, Bert Kalmar, Harry Ruby)  – 3:25 (k.d. lang solo)
 "I Wonder" (Cecil Gant, Raymond Leveen)  – 3:49
 "Dream a Little Dream of Me" (Fabian Andre, Gus Kahn, Wilbur Schwandt)  – 3:52
 "You Can't Lose a Broken Heart" (James P. Johnson, Eddie Miller)  – 3:14
 "That Lucky Old Sun (Just Rolls Around Heaven All Day)" (Haven Gillespie, Beasley Smith)  – 4:36 (k.d. lang solo)
 "If We Never Meet Again" (Louis Armstrong, Horace Gerlach)  – 3:52

Personnel
 Tony Bennett – vocals
 k.d. lang – vocals
 Lee Musiker – piano, arrangements
 Clayton Cameron – drums
 Paul Langosch – double bass
 Gray Sargent – guitar
 Scott Hamilton – tenor saxophone
 Peter Matz – conductor

Charts

Weekly charts

Year-end charts

Certifications

References

2002 albums
Tony Bennett albums
K.d. lang albums
Albums produced by T Bone Burnett
Columbia Records albums
Covers albums
Grammy Award for Best Traditional Pop Vocal Album
Vocal duet albums